John Van Dyke (April 3, 1807 – December 24, 1878) was an American jurist and Whig Party politician who represented  in the United States House of Representatives from 1847 to 1851.

Early life
He was born on April 3, 1807 in the Lamington section of Bedminster Township in Somerset County, New Jersey.  He was a son of Abraham Van Dyke and Sarah (née Honeyman) Van Dyke.
 
After completing his preparatory and law studies, Van Dyke was admitted to the Bar in 1836.

Career
He began practice in New Brunswick, New Jersey. In 1841, Van Dyke became prosecuting attorney of Middlesex County. A few years later, in 1846–1847, he served as president of the Bank of New Jersey at New Brunswick, while also serving as Mayor of New Brunswick, New Jersey.

Van Dyke's political career also began in 1847; he was elected to the Thirtieth and Thirty-first Congresses as a Whig. He served until March 3, 1851. Van Dyke declined re-nomination for another term, choosing instead to continue his law practice. He was a delegate to the 1856 Republican National Convention, and from 1859 to 1866 he served as a judge on the New Jersey Supreme Court.

In 1868, Van Dyke moved to Wabasha, Minnesota, where he went on to serve in the Minnesota Senate from 1872 to 1873 and a judge of the third judicial district from 1873 to 1878.

Personal life
On October 7, 1841, Van Dyke was married to Mary Dix Strong (1819–1873), a daughter of prominent mathematician and professor Theodore Strong.  His wife was the aunt of New Jersey State Senator Theodore Strong. Together, they were the parents of nine children, four of whom died in infancy:

 Theodore Strong Van Dyke (b. 1842), a Princeton graduate and lawyer who married Lois A. Funk.
 John Van Dyke (1844–1845), who died young.
 Abraham Van Dyke (1847–1848), who died young.
 John Van Dyke (1849–1850), who died young.
 Frederick William Van Dyke (b. 1852), a doctor who married Minnie E. Comstock in 1878. 
 Robert Van Dyke (1854–1885), a lawyer who married Mary Westphal.
 John Charles Van Dyke (b. 1856), who was the librarian of Sage Library in New Brunswick, New Jersey.
 Mary Augusta Van Dyke (1859–1860), who died young.
 Woodbridge Strong Van Dyke (1862–1889), who married Laura Winston (1867–1951).

Van Dyke died in Wabasha, Minnesota on December 24, 1878. He is interred in Wabasha's Riverview Cemetery.

Descendants
Through his son Woodbridge, he was the grandfather of film director and writer Woodbridge Strong Van Dyke II, (known as W. S. Van Dyke), who received two Academy Award nominations for Best Director.

References

External links

John Van Dyke at The Political Graveyard

1807 births
1878 deaths
Mayors of New Brunswick, New Jersey
Minnesota state senators
Justices of the Supreme Court of New Jersey
People from Bedminster, New Jersey
People from Wabasha, Minnesota
Minnesota Republicans
New Jersey Republicans
Burials in Minnesota
Whig Party members of the United States House of Representatives from New Jersey
19th-century American politicians
19th-century American judges